Anne Frances Hazlitt (born April 1963) is a British broadcasting executive.

Early life
She was born in south-west Surrey. She attended Downe House School from 1974 to 1980. She attended the Goldsmiths University from 1981 to 1984, where she studied English and Drama.

Career

Hazlitt's career started in trade magazine publisher Centaur Communications, working in the advertising sales department.

Yahoo!
She joined Yahoo! UK in December 1999, became European Sales Director in 2000, and was managing director from 2003 to July 2005 of Yahoo! UK & Ireland. In June 2005 she was winner in the media category in the First Women Awards ceremony, organised by the CBI and Real Business magazine.

Virgin Radio
From July 2005 to March 2007 she was Chief Executive of Virgin Radio UK (since 2008 called Absolute Radio). She put Virgin Radio onto Freeview (UK). Virgin Radio UK was owned by SMG. The station group included Virgin Radio, Virgin Radio Classic Rock and Virgin Radio Groove. She resigned from Virgin Radio on 8 January 2007.

GCap Media
In May 2007 she became managing director of GCap London, the largest commercial radio group in the United Kingdom, and bought £250,000 worth of GCap shares. She was appointed Chief Executive of the company in December 2007, but left in April 2008 when the company was bought by Global Radio.

ITV
From July 2010 until March 2015, she was a managing director at ITV, at the London Television Centre (The London Studios), on the south bank of the Thames.

References

External links
 British Council
 Mentore

1963 births
British radio executives
British women chief executives
People educated at Downe House School
People from Fulham
Virgin Radio (UK)
Yahoo! people
Living people
British women radio presenters